John Tateishi (born 1939) is the former redress director of the Japanese American Citizens League and was a key figure in the campaign for reparations for the Internment of Japanese Americans.

Life 
Tateishi was born in Los Angeles, California, in 1939. Tateishi was two at the time of the Pearl Harbor attack, and with his family was forced to move to the Manzanar center for the duration of the war as part of the enforcement of Executive Order 9066. Tateishi was key to the 1978 launch of the campaign.

At University of California, Berkeley he studied English literature and later did graduate studies at University of California, Davis. He took a teaching position at the City College of San Francisco and became involved with the Japanese American Citizens League in 1975.

In 1978, he became the chair of the National Committee for Redress and helped guide the campaign. He resigned from the city college in 1981 to fully focus on the campaign, and served as the principal lobbyist for it through his position as the redress director. Tateishi left the campaign two years before the Civil Liberties Act of 1988. 

He rejoined the organization as national executive director in 1999, and focused on criticizing the Bush administration's handling of the post 9/11 crisis.

Books 

 And Justice for All: An Oral History of the Japanese American Detention Camps – March 1, 1999
 Redress: The Inside Story of the Successful Campaign for Japanese American Reparations – March 10, 2020

References 

1939 births
Japanese-American civil rights activists
Japanese-American internees
University of California, Berkeley alumni
University of California, Davis alumni
City College of San Francisco faculty
Living people